Robert "Bobby" Semple (born 5 April 1948) is a retired Scottish professional darts player.

Darts career
Semple competed at the inaugural BDO World Darts Championship 1978 losing 6–1 to John Lowe. In 1977 he won the Scottish Masters beating Rab Smith in the final.

World Championship Results

BDO
 1978: 1st round (lost to John Lowe 1–6) (legs)

External links
Profile at Darts Database
Profile at Dartsmad

Scottish darts players
British Darts Organisation players
Living people
1948 births